The Tatra 82 was a heavy-duty car model made by Czech manufacturer Tatra between 1935 and 1938. It was mainly used for military cargo and personnel.

The vehicle had an air-cooled OHC four-cylinder boxer engine with 2490 cc and  power. The car had 3 axles, of which both back axles were driven. It had 8 gears and 1 reverse gear. It was based on the Tatra backbone chassis conception.

In two years, a total of 325 vehicles produced.

Variants

Tatra 82: Main production version.

References

82
Cars of the Czech Republic
Military trucks of Czechoslovakia
Automobiles with backbone chassis